Loyga is a rural locality (a settlement) in Rostovsko-Minskoye Rural Settlement of Ustyansky District, Arkhangelsk Oblast, Russia. The population was 1,303 as of 2010. There are 21 streets.

Geography 
Loyga is located 198 km east of Oktyabrsky (the district's administrative centre) by road. Kizema is the nearest rural locality.

References 

Rural localities in Ustyansky District